The Niggard Rich (O Rico Avarento, in the original title) is a play written by Ariano Suassuna, published in 1954 and based in Molière's literary composition.

Plot
The story, located in Brazil's northeast, is about a rich and powerful colonel and his two employees. Day after day, the colonel shows his avarice to the citizens of his small village, negating alms and food to the poor people who visits his house in desperation. Then, the niggard rich receives an unexpected visit: the Chief of Hell and his dogs appear to arrest him because of his sins.

Reputation in Brazil
The play is considered one of Suassuna's best creations
, at the side of O Auto da Compadecida and O Santo e a Porca.

External links
Ariano Suassuna's Official Website

1954 plays
Brazilian plays
Plays by Ariano Suassuna